Roxie was an unincorporated community in Raleigh County, West Virginia, United States, located five miles west of Beckley.

References 

Unincorporated communities in West Virginia